Washington Chapel C.M.E. Church is a historic Christian Methodist Episcopal church located at 1137 West Street in Parkville, Platte County, Missouri.  It was built in 1907, and is a two-story, rectangular, Late Gothic Revival style native limestone building.  It has a gable roof and features a castellated corner tower and projecting bays.

It was listed on the National Register of Historic Places in 1992.

References

African-American history of Missouri
Methodist churches in Missouri
Churches on the National Register of Historic Places in Missouri
Gothic Revival church buildings in Missouri
Churches completed in 1907
Buildings and structures in Platte County, Missouri
Christian Methodist Episcopal churches
National Register of Historic Places in Platte County, Missouri